The 23rd British Academy Film Awards, given by the British Academy of Film and Television Arts in 1970, honoured the best films of 1969.

Winners and nominees

Statistics

See also
 42nd Academy Awards
 22nd Directors Guild of America Awards
 27th Golden Globe Awards
 22nd Writers Guild of America Awards

References 

Film023
1969 film awards
1970 in British cinema